William Brownlow Forde (1823 - 8 February 1902) was the Member of Parliament for County Down, 1857–1874.

Colonel the Rt. Hon. William Brownlow Forde, PC, JP, DL, of Seaforde, married Adelaide, daughter of General the Hon Robert Meade, of Burrenwood, in 1855, and was High Sheriff of County Down, 1853; Lieutenant-Colonel, the Royal South Down Militia; Colonel, 1854–1881, 5th Battalion, Royal Irish Rifles. He was also a member of the landed gentry.

References

External links

UK MPs 1857–1859
UK MPs 1859–1865
UK MPs 1865–1868
UK MPs 1868–1874
1823 births
1902 deaths
Members of the Parliament of the United Kingdom for County Down constituencies (1801–1922)
People from County Down
High Sheriffs of Down